Rolf Ingmar Junefelt (born 15 May 1938) is a Swedish modern pentathlete who competed at the 1964 Summer Olympics. He finished tenth individually and fourth with the Swedish team.

References

External links
 

1938 births
Living people
Swedish male modern pentathletes
Olympic modern pentathletes of Sweden
Modern pentathletes at the 1964 Summer Olympics
People from Jönköping
Sportspeople from Jönköping County
20th-century Swedish people